Smolinski or Smoliński (feminine: Smolińska; plural: Smolińscy) is a Polish surname. It may refer to:

 Aaron Smolinski, Canadian actor
 Bryan Smolinski (born 1971), American ice hockey player
 Jake Smolinski (born 1989), American baseball player
 Kacper Smoliński (born 2001), Polish footballer
 Marcin Smoliński (born 1985), Polish footballer
 Martin Smolinski (born 1984), German motorcycle rider
 Mark Smolinski (born 1939), American football player
 Rafał Smoliński (born 1977), Polish rower
 Włodzimierz Smoliński (born 1938), Polish wrestler
 Zdzisław Smoliński (1942–1993), Polish athlete

See also
 

Polish-language surnames